Some areas of Jamaica, particularly population centers such as Kingston, Montego Bay and Spanish Town, experience high levels of crime and violence. Jamaica has had one of the highest murder rates in the world for many years, according to United Nations estimates. Former Prime Minister P. J. Patterson described the situation as "a national challenge of unprecedented proportions".

Murder rate

When Jamaica gained independence in 1962, the murder rate was 3.9 per 100,000 inhabitants, one of the lowest in the world. In 2005, Jamaica had 1,674 murders, for a murder rate of 58 per 100,000 people, the highest murder rate in the world. In November 2008,  the Jamaican Parliament voted to retain the death penalty, which is performed by hanging.

Jamaica recorded 1,680 murders in 2009.  In 2010, there were 1,428, in 2011, 1,125.  2012 saw 1,097, 2013, 1,200.  2014 totaled 1,192, 2015, 1,450, 2016, 1,350 and 2017, 1,616. 
1,287 murders were reported in 2018.

Emergencies 
On November 15, 2022, the Jamaican Prime Minister Andrew Holness declared a state of emergency for certain regions of Jamaica because of rising crime rates. Some areas affected by the measures include the capital Kingston, and the popular tourist destination of Montego Bay. This followed a travel warning from the U.S. State Department suggesting travelers to not travel to certain areas of the country due to crime rates.

See also
Jamaican posse
The Harder They Come
Yardies

References